The 1890 Brown Bears football team represented Brown University during the 1890 college football season.

Schedule

References

Brown
Brown Bears football seasons
Brown Bears football